HMS Minotaur was the lead ship of the  armoured cruisers built for the Royal Navy. Launched in 1906, she served as the flagship of the China Station before the First World War. Shortly after the war began, the ship searched unsuccessfully for the German East Asia Squadron and was transferred to the Grand Fleet at the end of 1914. During the rest of the war Minotaur served as the flagship of the 7th and 2nd Cruiser Squadrons and spent most of her time assigned to the Northern Patrol. In mid-1916 she participated in the Battle of Jutland but did not fire her weapons during the battle. The ship was paid off in 1919 and sold for scrap the following year.

Description

The engines were powered by 24 Yarrow water-tube boilers. Minotaur was designed to carry 779 officers and men, but mustered 825 in 1909.

The ship's main armament consisted of four BL 9.2-inch Mark X guns in two twin-gun turrets, one each fore and aft. Her secondary armament, ten BL 7.5-inch Mark II guns, were mounted amidships in single turrets. Anti-torpedo boat defence was provided by sixteen QF 12-pounder (three-inch) 18-cwt guns. Minotaur also mounted five submerged 18-inch torpedo tubes, one of which was mounted in the stern.

Construction and career
Minotaur was ordered as part of the 1904–05 naval construction programme as the last of three  armoured cruisers. She was laid down on 2 January 1905 at Devonport Royal Dockyard and was christened on 6 June 1907 by the Countess of Crewe. The ship suffered a coal gas explosion that injured three sailors and one dockyard worker on 6 November before she was commissioned on 1 April 1908. Minotaur cost £1,410,356. The ship was assigned to the 5th Cruiser Squadron of the Home Fleet upon commissioning. She escorted the royal yacht Victoria and Albert from Kiel, Germany to Reval when King Edward VII and his wife visited in Russia in June. The next month Minotaur escorted the battlecruiser  as it carried the Prince of Wales to Canada to commemorate the tercentenary of Quebec City. The ship was transferred to the 1st Cruiser Squadron when the Home Fleet reorganized on 24 March 1909. She was present for two fleet reviews in June and July before she was ordered to the China Station in January 1910 to relieve  as flagship.

Minotaur was in Wei Hai Wei on 3 July 1914 when most of the ships assigned to the China Station were ordered to assemble at Hong Kong. Shortly after the start of the First World War, the ship, together with the armoured cruiser  and the light cruiser  sailed for the German-owned island of Yap. They captured the collier Elsbeth on 11 August and destroyed the radio station there with gunfire. They then unsuccessfully searched for the ships of the East Asia Squadron until the light cruiser  was reported to have destroyed several ships in the Bay of Bengal in mid-September. Minotaur was ordered to the west coast of Sumatra to search for the German warship, but was unsuccessful. She was then ordered to escort a troop convoy from Wellington, New Zealand in late September. The ship was detached from the convoy and ordered to proceed to the Cape of Good Hope and reinforce the squadron there on 6 November after the Admiralty learned of the defeat at the Battle of Coronel. Upon her arrival Minotaur became flagship of the Cape of Good Hope Station under the command of Vice Admiral Herbert King-Hall and escorted a South African troop convoy to Luderitz Bay in German South-West Africa. The ship was near Table Bay, South Africa when the East Asia Squadron was destroyed during the Battle of the Falklands in early December and she was ordered home on 8 December.

Upon her arrival, Minotaur became flagship of the 7th Cruiser Squadron, under the command of Rear Admiral Arthur Waymouth, based at Cromarty Firth. She received a brief refit in early 1915 and was then assigned to Northern Patrol for the next year. The ship received a QF 12-pounder (three-inch) 12-cwt anti-aircraft (AA) gun and a QF three-pounder (47 mm) AA gun in 1915–16. The 12-pounder gun was mounted on the aft superstructure and the three-pounder on the quarterdeck at the extreme rear. The ship was transferred to the 2nd Cruiser Squadron on 30 May 1916 and participated in the Battle of Jutland on the following day as flagship of Rear Admiral Herbert Heath. She remained unengaged throughout the battle and did not fire her 9.2 or 7.5-inch guns at all during the battle. Minotaur was also present during the attempted interception of the High Seas Fleet by the Grand Fleet on 19 August although no combat occurred. For the rest of the war, the ship was assigned to the Northern Patrol. On 11 December 1917, together with her sister  and four destroyers, she was assigned to patrol the convoy route between Lerwick and Norway, but the Germans successfully destroyed a convoy off the Norwegian coast on the following day and returned home without being spotted. The British ships were only able to rescue survivors and escort the sole surviving ship from the convoy, the crippled destroyer , back to Scapa Flow.

In 1917–18 the 12-pounder AA gun mounted on the aft superstructure was moved to the roof of the forward 9.2-inch gun turret and a fire-control system was installed with a director mounted on a platform fitted to the foremast. Minotaur was paid off on 5 February 1919, placed on the disposal list in May, put up for sale in March 1920 and sold the following month.

Notes

References

Bibliography

External links
 
 Battle of Jutland Crew Lists Project - HMS Minotaur Crew List

 

Minotaur-class cruisers (1906)
Ships built in Plymouth, Devon
1906 ships
World War I cruisers of the United Kingdom